Parvez Aziz (born 8 December 1987) is an Indian cricketer who plays for Assam cricket team. He also represented the India under 19 team during 2006 and  Ahmedabad Rockets in now defunct ICL. He is a left-handed opening batsman who can bowls slow left-arm orthodox balls.
Aziz made his first-class debut on 7 November 2004 against Baroda at Guwahati in the 2004–05 Ranji Trophy and List A debut on 15 January 2005 against Bengal at Kolkata in the Ranji One-Day Trophy.

References

External links
 

1987 births
Living people
Indian cricketers
Assam cricketers
East Zone cricketers
Ahmedabad Rockets cricketers
Royal Bengal Tigers cricketers
Cricketers from Guwahati